Midway Independent School District may refer to:

 Midway Independent School District (Clay County, Texas)
 Midway Independent School District (McLennan County, Texas)
Midway Independent School District (Woodbury County, Iowa)